Octopus hawaiiensis, also known as the Hawaiian octopus or crescent octopus, is an octopus in the family Octopodidae endemic to Hawaii.

Description
Octopus hawaiiensis uses venom to kill its prey. Its diet consists of mollusks, such as crabs, and fish.

Distribution

References

Octopodidae
Molluscs of Hawaii
Cephalopods described in 1852
Endemic fauna of Hawaii